Replicator may refer to various things related to replication:

Science
 Replicator (evolution unit), the theoretical basic unit of evolution in the gene-centered view of evolution
 Replicator (self-replication), a component that facilitates self-replication
 DNA replication, the process of producing two identical copies from one original DNA molecule
 Replicator (nanotechnology), a device to precisely position molecules to guide chemical reactions
 Clanking replicator, an artificial self-replicating system that relies on conventional large-scale technology and automation
 Replicator equation, a deterministic monotone non-linear and non-innovative game dynamic used in evolutionary game theory
 Replicator (cellular automaton), a pattern

In culture
 Replicator (Stargate), a fictional species in the Stargate universe
 Replicator (Star Trek), a fictional technology in the Star Trek universe
 Replicator (band), a noise rock band from Oakland, California